The 1889 Washington football team was an American football team that represented the University of Washington during the 1889 college football season. The 1889 Washington team was the first team to represent the University of Washington.  The team played only one game, losing to a team made up of eastern college alumni, 20–0, in Seattle on November 28, 1889. Frank Griffiths was the team captain.

Schedule

References

Washington
Washington Huskies football seasons
College football winless seasons
Washington football